, officially , is a district of Chiyoda, Tokyo, Japan, consisting of 1-chōme and 2-chōme. As of April 1, 2007, its population is 1,019.

This district is located on the northeastern part of Chiyoda Ward. It borders (across Kanda River) Soto-Kanda and Kanda-Sakumachō on the north, Kanda-Iwamotochō on the east, Kanda-Kajichō and Kajichō on the south, and Kanda-Awajichō, Kanda-Ogawamachi and Kanda-Tachō on the west.

Sudachō once had a terminal which served for a number of the Tokyo City Streetcar lines. It is one of the few areas that survived the bombing of Tokyo in World War II , resulting in many historic buildings still existing.

Education
 operates public elementary and junior high schools. Chiyoda Elementary School (千代田小学校) is the zoned elementary school for Kanda-Sudachō 2-chōme and the following ban of 1-chōme: 7, 16, 18, 20, 22, 24, 26, 28, 30, 32, and 34. Shōhei Elementary School (昌平小学校) is the zoned elementary school for the following ban of 1-chōme: 1-6, 8-15, 17, 19, 21, 23, and 25. There is a freedom of choice system for junior high schools in Chiyoda Ward, and so there are no specific junior high school zones.

References

Districts of Chiyoda, Tokyo